McKay's is a settlement in Newfoundland and Labrador. The settlement was first settled by Ann Hulan in the 1760s. Its population as of the 2011 census was 1,298.

References

Populated places in Newfoundland and Labrador